The Husky VMMD (Vehicle-Mounted Mine Detection) is a  configurable counter-IED MRAP (Mine-Resistant Ambush Protected) vehicle, developed by South African-based DCD Protected Mobility and American C-IED company Critical Solutions International. Designed for use in route clearance and demining operations, the Husky is equipped with a variety of technologies and features to detect explosive devices and survive blast damage. 

The Husky VMMD detects and identifies land mines and improvised explosive devices (IEDs) using a range of sensors and imaging systems. Additionally, the Husky is equipped with a variety of countermeasures, such as jamming systems and smoke generators that can be used to neutralize or disrupt IEDs. The Husky VMMD's armor is specifically engineered to withstand the effects of land mines and IEDs, while the vehicle's suspension system enables it to navigate rough terrain without compromising the crew's safety.

Development 
The Husky traces its lineage to the Pookie, a Rhodesian mine clearance vehicle. 

Originally used as the lead element of a mine removal convoy, the Husky was employed as part of the Chubby mine detection system. The early Chubby system comprised a lead detection vehicle (the Meerkat), a second proofing vehicle (the Husky) towing a mine detonation trailer, and a third vehicle carrying spare parts for expedient blast repair.

The Husky was initially deployed in the 1970s. During the South African Border War, the South African Defense Force used the Husky extensively to clear mines from military convoy routes in Namibia and Angola.

In the mid-1990s, DCD Group and Critical Solutions International planned to bring the technology to the U.S. and underwent a two-year foreign comparative test program with the United States Department of Defense and follow-on modifications and testing. In 1997, CSI was directed to produce and deliver production systems under the U.S. Army Interim Vehicle Mounted Mine Detection Program.

Over the next twenty years, the Husky underwent several iterations and upgrades. U.S. military clearance units currently train on and employ Husky vehicles as detection assets and clearance vehicles.

Design 
The Husky is part of a class of MRAP vehicles developed from South African blast protection designs.

The sharp V-hull of the Husky reduces blast effect by increasing ground clearance and standoff from the blast, increasing structural hull rigidity, and diverting blast energy and fragmentation away from the platform and its occupants.

The Husky is designed to break apart in a blast event, allowing energy to transfer to the detachable front and rear modules rather than the critical components of the vehicle or the occupants located in the cab. Its three main components (a center cab with front and rear wheel modules) are connected by shear pins.

Critical components are engineered to break apart predictably, preventing catastrophic damage and enabling users to quickly replace modules on site. This approach increases the lifespan of the vehicle and limits the need for recovery teams to evacuate the vehicle to maintenance facilities.

The cabin of the Husky is fitted with bulletproof glass windows. There is an entry hatch on the roof.

The Husky Mk III and 2G are powered by a Mercedes-Benz OM906LA turbo diesel engine coupled with an Allison Transmission 2500 SP 5-speed automatic transmission. It can reach a maximum speed of 72 km/h and has a range of 350 km.

Variants

Husky Mk I 
First Husky production model. Replaced by Husky Mk II.

Husky Mk II 
Second Husky model. Replaced by Husky Mk III.

Husky Mk III 
Modern single-occupant Husky model. The platform is integrated with pulse induction metal detector panels and overpass tires that enable operators to regulate tire air pressure in order to reduce the risk of initiating land mines without causing detonation. The Mk III, like other Husky models, is engineered in a modular, frangible configuration.

Husky 2G

Project Type 
- Mine clearance vehicle

Manufacturer 
- DCD Protected Mobility

Crew 
- Two

Operating Weight 
- 9,200kg

Husky 2G is a two-seat variant of Husky MK III vehicle mounted mine detector (VMMD) designed and manufactured by South African firm DCD Protected Mobility (DCD PM). Equipped with a number of sensors, the vehicle is ideally suited for mine-clearing operations including detection, identification and destruction of improvised explosive devices (IED), landmines and other explosive materials.

Development of the Husky 2G was prompted by the need to conduct longer missions and employ multiple detection systems. The Husky 2G was designed with added high sensitivity detectors, ground-penetrating radar, video optics suites, and remote weapon stations. These additional components required a second operator to manage the additional workload, hence the required two occupants.

Equipment 
The Husky is capable of carrying the following equipment and payloads:
 Autonomous vehicle upgrades
 Rocket-propelled grenade armor and netting
 Smoke grenade launchers
 Electronic countermeasures
 Remote weapon station

 Metal detectors
 Ground-penetrating radar
 Nonlinear junction detectors
 Gunfire detectors

 Robotic arms
 Blowers
 Water diggers
 Thermal cameras
 Optics suite

 Mine-clearing line charges

 Mine rollers
 Rhino Passive Infrared Defeat System
 Mine plows
 Proofing rollers
 Electrostatic discharge
Red Pack repair kit

Operators

Husky Mk III 
 United States Army
 United States Marine Corps
 Canadian Army
 Australian Army
 South African Defense Force
 Kenyan Army

Husky 2G 

 Islamic Republic of Iran Army
 Iraqi Army
 Turkish Army
 Spanish Army
 Royal Saudi Land Forces
 Egyptian Army
 Jordanian Army
 Latvian Army
 United States Army (limited fielding in support of Operation Enduring Freedom)

Recognitions 
The Husky was listed on the U.S. Army’s Top Ten inventions of 2010.

References

External links

 Critical Solutions International (CSI)
Soldier Armed magazine article 

Military engineering vehicles
Cold War military equipment of South Africa
Mine warfare countermeasures
Military vehicles of the United States
Military vehicles of South Africa
Bomb disposal
Military vehicles introduced in the 1970s